The Probation Journal: The Journal of Community and Criminal Justice is a peer-reviewed academic journal covering criminal justice and probation that was established in 1929. It is published by SAGE Publications in association with the National Association of Probation Officers (England).

Abstracting and indexing 
The Probation Journal is abstracted and indexed in the following databases:

References

External links 
 

Publications established in 1929
Criminology journals
English-language journals
Quarterly journals
SAGE Publishing academic journals
Probation
1929 establishments in England